Koehler is a transliteration of the German surname Köhler, referring to a man making charcoal from wood. Notable people with the surname include:

 Ana Luiza Koehler (born 1977), Brazilian comics artist and architect.
Arthur Koehler (1885–1967), American investigator notable for his role in the Lindbergh kidnapping investigation
 Bernhard Koehler (1849–1927), German industrialist and art collector
Carl-Erik Koehler (1895–1958), German general during World War II
Carla Koehler, American biochemist
 Don Koehler (1925–1981), American recognized as tallest man in the world from 1969 to 1981
Ernest Koehler (1903–1960), American Olympic racewalker
Florence Koehler (1861–1944), American craftswoman, designer and jeweler
Frederick Koehler (born 1975), American actor
 Garry Koehler (1955–2019), Australian songwriter
 Greg Koehler  (born 1975), Canadian ice hockey player for the Bloomington Prairie Thunder in the International Hockey League
Herman Koehler (1859–1927), American football coach, athletics administrator, and United States Army officer
Herman Koehler (end) (1873–1931), American college football and ice hockey player
 Hugo W. Koehler (1886–1941), American naval officer and special agent during the Russian Civil War
Jack Koehler (1930–2012), German-born American journalist and executive for the Associated Press, who also briefly served as the White House Communications Director
James Stark Koehler (1914– 2006), American physicist, specializing in metal defects and their interactions, known for the eponymous Peach-Koehler stress formula
Ján Koehler (died 1895), Polish operatic baritone
  (1860–1931), French zoologist 
 Johann Gottfried Koehler (1745–1801), German astronomer who discovered a number of nebulae, star clusters, and galaxies
 Judy Koehler (born 1941), Republican, former Illinois State Representative, U.S. Senate nominee, 18th Congressional district primary contestant, and losing incumbent to the Illinois 3rd District Appellate Court
Kyle Koehler (born 1961), American politician, Representative for the 79th district of the Ohio House of Representatives
Lyle Koehler (1944–2015). American historian and author
 Marc Koehler (born 1977), Dutch architect
Maria João Koehler (born 1992), Portuguese tennis player
Megan Koehler (born 1989), Canadian curler
Otto Koehler (1889–1974), German zoologist and pioneer ethologist
 Pip Koehler (1902–1986), former Major League Baseball outfielder for the 1925 New York Giants
 Paul Koehler, drummer in Silverstein, a Canadian straight-edge emo band
 Robert Koehler, German-born painter and art teacher who spent most of his career in the United States of America
 Ted Koehler (1894–1973), American lyricist who collaborated with composer Harold Arlen to write for live shows and movies from the 1920s through the 1940s
 Tom Koehler (born 1986), American baseball player

See also
 Koehler Township, Michigan, a township in Cheboygan County, Michigan, USA
 Koehler Instrument Company, Inc.,a company in Bohemia, New York, USA
Koehler Cultural Center, located on the campus of San Antonio College, Texas, USA

German-language surnames
Occupational surnames